Christopher Porter is a Canadian political activist

Christopher Porter may also refer to:

Christopher Porter (architect), 19th century Australian architect

See also
Chris Porter (disambiguation)